Ziyadlı (also, Ziyadly and Ziyatly) is a village and municipality in the Samukh Rayon of Azerbaijan.  It has a population of 2,091.

References 

Populated places in Samukh District